Ignaz Puschnik (5 February 1934 – 17 December 2020) was an Austrian football midfielder who played for Austria in the 1958 FIFA World Cup. He also played for Kapfenberger SV.

Puschnik died on 17 December 2020, at the age of 86.

References

1934 births
Austrian footballers
Austria international footballers
Association football midfielders
Kapfenberger SV players
1958 FIFA World Cup players
2020 deaths